is a Japanese football player.

Career
On 30 June 2012, Tokura scored a long-distance goal from outside the penalty box and celebrated his goal with a "Mario Balotelli-style" celebration, which resembles the celebration after Balotelli's second goal against Germany in Euro 2012 Semi Final. He was then given a yellow card by the referee.

Career statistics
Updated to 25 February 2019

References

External links
Profile at Consadole Sapporo

1986 births
Living people
Association football people from Tokyo
Japanese footballers
J1 League players
J2 League players
Kawasaki Frontale players
Thespakusatsu Gunma players
Vissel Kobe players
Hokkaido Consadole Sapporo players
Cerezo Osaka players
V-Varen Nagasaki players
Association football forwards